Anastrangalia kasaharai is a species of beetle from family Cerambycidae that is endemic to Japan. The species are either black or red coloured.

References

Lepturinae
Beetles described in 2002
Endemic fauna of Japan